The final stages of the 2012 Copa Bridgestone Sudamericana de Clubes consisted of four stages:
Round of 16 (first legs: September 25–27, October 2–3; second legs: October 23–25)
Quarterfinals (first legs: October 30–November 1; second legs: November 7–8, 15)
Semifinals (first legs: November 22; second legs: November 28–29)
Finals (first leg: December 5; second leg: December 12)

Format
The defending champion, Universidad de Chile, and the fifteen winners of the second stage (three from Argentina, four from Brazil, eight from rest of South America) qualified for the final stages. The sixteen teams played a single-elimination tournament, and were seeded depending on which second stage tie they won (i.e., the winner of Match O1 would be assigned the 1 seed, etc.; Universidad de Chile were assigned the 10 seed). In each stage, teams played in two-legged ties on a home-away basis, with the higher-seeded team playing the second leg at home. Each team earned 3 points for a win, 1 point for a draw, and 0 points for a loss. The following criteria were used for breaking ties on points, except for the final:
Goal difference
Away goals
Penalty shootout (no extra time is played)

For the final, the first tiebreaker was goal difference. If the teams are tied on goal difference, the away goals rule would not be applied, and 30 minutes of extra time would be played. If still had tied after extra time, the title would be decided by penalty shootout.

If two teams from the same association reach the semifinals, they would be forced to play each other.

Bracket
In each tie, the higher-seeded team played the second leg at home.

Round of 16

|-

|}

Match A

Tied on points 3–3, Millonarios won on goal difference.

Match B

Tied on points 2–2, São Paulo won on away goals.

Match C

Independiente won on points 6–0.

Match D

Tied on points 3–3, Tigre won on goal difference.

Match E

Cerro Porteño won on points 6–0.

Match F

Tied on points 3–3, Universidad Católica won on away goals.

Match G

Universidad de Chile won on points 4–1.

Match H

Grêmio won on points 6–0.

Quarterfinals

|-

|}

Match S1

Tied on points 3–3, Millonarios won on goal difference.

Match S2

São Paulo won on points 6–0.

Match S3

Universidad Católica won on points 4–1.

Match S4

Tied on points 3–3, Tigre won on goal difference.

Semifinals

|-

|}

Match F1

Tied on points 2–2, Tigre won on away goals.

Match F2

Tied on points 2–2, São Paulo won on away goals.

Finals

The Finals were played over two legs, with the higher-seeded team playing the second leg at home. If the teams were tied on points and goal difference at the end of regulation in the second leg, the away goals rule would not be applied and 30 minutes of extra time would be played. If still tied after extra time, the title would be decided by penalty shootout.

The second leg was abandoned after 45 minutes by the referee, as the Tigre players refused to come back to play the rest of the match after incidents at halftime. Therefore, São Paulo were declared as the champion.

São Paulo won on points 4–1.

References

External links
Official webpage 

Final Stages